Norís is a locality located in the municipality of Alins, in Province of Lleida province, Catalonia, Spain. As of 2020, it has a population of 9.

Geography 
Norís is located 164km north-northeast of Lleida.

References

Populated places in the Province of Lleida